Richard Schweizer (23 December 1899 – 30 March 1965) was a Swiss screenwriter who won the Academy Award for Best Original Screenplay in 1945 for his work in Marie-Louise, as well as the Academy Award for Best Story in 1948 for his work in The Search. Schweizer also directed the film Kleine Scheidegg (1937).

Selected filmography
Director
 Kleine Scheidegg (1937)

Screenwriter
 Füsilier Wipf (1938)
 Constable Studer (1939)
 Gilberte de Courgenay (1942)
 Marie-Louise (1944)
 The Search (1948)
 Swiss Tour (1949)
 Heidi (1952)
 Uli the Tenant (1955)
 The Mountains Between Us (1956)
 The Cheese Factory in the Hamlet (1958)

External links

1899 births
1965 deaths
Best Original Screenplay Academy Award winners
German-language film directors
Best Story Academy Award winners
Swiss screenwriters
Male screenwriters
Film people from Zürich
20th-century screenwriters